Deena Abdel Rahman (born 23 February 1983) is a football coach and midfielder. She has represented the England women's national under-19 football team and the Bahrain women's national football team. At club level she was formerly a professional with Fulham.

Club career
Rahman began playing football with Fulham at seven years old, initially as the only girl in the club's boys' youth system. When the women's and girls' section was reinstated shortly afterwards, she transferred to the female youth teams.

Following one season with the Arsenal Academy at under-14 level, Rahman returned to Fulham and joined the first team squad. In 2000, when Fulham became the first full-time professional women's football club in Europe, Rahman was one of six existing players to be kept on.

She scored in a 7–1 win over Birmingham City in the 2001–02 final of the FA Women's Premier League Cup. Fulham signed a number of strong and experienced players which meant Rahman was not always first choice. She remained with the club after they lost their professional status in 2003, but she was disrupted by an ankle injury and then the club was disbanded altogether in 2006.

Rahman moved to Egypt at her father's suggestion and played for Wadi Degla for one year, before she sustained an anterior cruciate ligament injury and returned to England for treatment.

International career
At 15 years old Rahman was called-up to the England women's national under-18 football team. She made her debut against the Netherlands in 1998 and went on to win 18 caps, playing in two editions of the UEFA Women's Under-19 Championship.

In 2011, Rahman agreed to switch her international eligibility to Bahrain women's national football team. She had trained with the team to regain her fitness after moving to the country the previous year. She was called-up for the WAFF Women's Championship in 2011.

By May 2017 Rahman had scored 23 goals in her 40 appearances for Bahrain.

International goals

Personal life
Rahman was born in Fulham to an Egyptian father, Maher, and an English mother, Dawn. She was among the first female members of the Professional Footballers Association (PFA) and studied a Sports Science degree with their assistance.

In 2012 Rahman married Paul Shipwright. They have run a football coaching business, Tekkers Academy, in Bahrain since 2015. Rahman holds five Guinness World Records as a result of her charity work.

Honours

Fulham
FA Women's Premier League National Division: 2002–03
FA Women's Premier League Southern Division: 2001–02
South East Combination Women's Football League: 2000–01
FA Women's Cup: 2001–02, 2002–03
FA Women's Premier League Cup: 2001–02, 2002–03

References

External links
Profile at Fulham FC
 

1983 births
Living people
Footballers from Greater London
English women's footballers
Fulham L.F.C. players
FA Women's National League players
Women's association football midfielders
Bahrain women's international footballers
Bahraini women's footballers
Naturalized citizens of Bahrain
English people of Egyptian descent
England women's youth international footballers